Ficus panurensis is a species of plant in the family Moraceae. It is found in Brazil, Guyana, Suriname, and Venezuela.

References

 

panurensis
Least concern plants
Taxonomy articles created by Polbot